College Heights Historic District is a national historic district located at State College, Centre County, Pennsylvania.  The district includes 278 contributing buildings in an almost exclusively middle-class residential area of State College. The district reflects the growth and architecture of State College as an emerging college town.  The houses are largely wood frame and reflect a number of popular early-20th-century architectural styles including Colonial Revival, Tudor Revival, and Bungalow.

It was added to the National Register of Historic Places in 1995.

References

Historic districts on the National Register of Historic Places in Pennsylvania
Colonial Revival architecture in Pennsylvania
Tudor Revival architecture in Pennsylvania
Historic districts in Centre County, Pennsylvania
National Register of Historic Places in Centre County, Pennsylvania